The Capital Market Development Authority (CMDA) is the state entity responsible for the development and regulation of the securities market, and the capital market of Maldives. CMDA was established as an independent institution in 2006 with the passing of the  Maldives Securities Act 2006. Prior to that, it was functioning as a separate Division of the Maldives Monetary Authority (MMA).

CMDA regulates and supervises the Maldives Stock Exchange (MSE), and also grants licenses to Stock Brokers or Dealing Companies, Investment Advisors, Rating Agencies, and Investment or Mutual Funds. While CMDA is the equivalent of the Securities and Exchange Commission in other countries, it has a dual role of further developing the capital market of the country, and protecting the interests of the investors through its regulations.

CMDA is governed by a Board of Directors, and daily operations are managed by the chief executive officer (CEO). The current CEO, Ms. Nadiya Hassan was appointed in October 2017. The board members are appointed as per Securities Act, and are represented by MMA, Ministry of Finance, Registrar of Companies, and the private sector. The President appoints all board members and the chairman.

CMDA is also the supervisory and regulatory authority of the Maldives Pension Fund, as per the Maldives Pension Act 2009.

References 

 
 https://web.archive.org/web/20150402125548/http://www.pension.gov.mv/uploads/downloads/laws-and-regulations/522458be41148.pdf
 
 
 

Government of the Maldives
Financial regulatory authorities
Economy of the Maldives